The 2013 Texas A&M Aggies football team represented Texas A&M University in the 2013 NCAA Division I FBS football season. They played their home games at Kyle Field.

Texas A&M played 8 games at Kyle Field during the 2013 season. The last time Texas A&M played 8 games at home was 1919 when the Aggies were awarded the National Championship after finishing the season undefeated and unscored upon.

The 2013 season featured the defending national champion Alabama Crimson Tide playing at Kyle Field in what was CBS' first game from that venue since 1989.

Before the season

Previous season
In 2012, Texas A&M played their first season in the SEC. They started out unranked and lost their opener to No. 24 Florida. However, the Aggies bounced back and went on a five-game win streak, including victories over two SEC West teams – Arkansas and Ole Miss – and a win over No. 23 Louisiana Tech. They fell to No. 6 LSU in a close home game before winning their final five regular-season games, highlighted by an upset victory over the defending national champion, No. 1 Alabama in Tuscaloosa. The streak also included a victory over No. 17 Mississippi State. The 2012 season saw the rise of quarterback Johnny Manziel, who went on to win the 2012 Heisman trophy as the first freshman ever to do so. The Aggies accepted an invitation to the 2013 Cotton Bowl Classic, in which they definitively handled old Big XII rival Oklahoma 41–13, and finished the season 11–2.

2013 NFL Draft
Five Texas A&M players were drafted in the 2013 NFL Draft.

After the draft, seven Aggies were signed as undrafted free agents.

Spring practice
Spring practice began on March 1 and ended with the annual Maroon and White game on April 13, which was televised nationally on ESPN. It also included an open scrimmage on March 23 and the Friday Night Lights game on April 5. A few key players were out with injuries: junior WR Malcome Kennedy, senior LB Steven Jenkins, sophomore DE Julien Obioha, and senior DL Kirby Ennis.

Throughout the spring, A&M saw great play out of its receivers (especially Mike Evans), the offensive line, led by senior LT Jake Matthews, and quarterbacks group, led by the all-star talent of Johnny Manziel. The running backs group looked loaded with talent and depth (including senior Ben Malena and sophomores Trey Williams, Tra Carson, and Brandon Williams) and looked to be a position of strength for the Aggies as well. The defensive backfield also seemed to have a few playmakers in CB Deshazor Everett and S Floyd Raven Sr. The linebacking corps, however, showed a lack of depth, especially without Senior Steven Jenkins, and was projected as an area of concern for the Aggies in the coming season. Another area of potential issue for A&M was the defensive line, as there was little depth (compounded by injuries) and a thus much riding on incoming freshmen that couldn't practice in the spring.

In the Maroon and White game, the Maroon (offense) prevailed over the White (defense) 43–23. For the quarterbacks, Manziel went 23-of-30 for 303 yards and three touchdowns, Matt Joeckel went 8-of-21 for 88 yards, and Matt Davis went 7-of-12 for 112 yards. Ben Malena played little (only 3 carries for 12 yards), so the team was led by sophomores Brandon Williams (7 for 59 yards and 1 TD) and Trey Williams (7 for 67 yards and 1 TD). Mike Evans had a solid game receiving with 5 catches for 73 yards, as did Derel Walker (5 for 79 yards and 1 TD) and LaKendrick Williams (7 for 105 yards). As for the defense, sacks were made by Nate Askew, Tyrone Taylor, Jordan Points, and Tyrell Taylor (who had 2).

Fall practice
Fall camp began on August 5 and concluded on August 25. It also included an open scrimmage on August 17 and Meet the Aggies Day on August 24. Several freshmen stood out during the camp, including receivers Ricky Seals-Jones and LaQuvionte Gonzalez; linebackers Darian Claiborne and Jordan Mastrogiovanni; defensive linemen Isaiah Golden, Daeshon Hall, and Hardreck Walker.

Predictions
Five editors from Athlon Sports and Stewart Mandel of SI.com predicted Texas A&M to finish 10–2. The SEC media projected A&M to finish second in the SEC West, behind Alabama.

Personnel

Roster

Recruiting class
In the 2013 recruiting class, Texas A&M signed 32 players (31 not counting TCU transfer A.J. Hilliard), 10 of which were included in the ESPN 300, with 5 of those in the ESPN 150. The class was ranked 8th in the nation by ESPN, 11th by Rivals, and 6th nationally by Scout.

Returning starters

Depth chart
Source:

Schedule
Texas A&M's 2013 schedule was released by the Southeastern Conference and Texas A&M on October 18, 2012.

Coaching staff

Rankings

Game summaries

Rice

Sources:
Official Texas A&M Game Notes (PDF)

Eight total players were suspended for half or all of the game, including six defensive starters and Johnny Manziel. Freshman (RS) WR Edward Pope, Senior LB Steven Jenkins, Sophomore CB De'Vante Harris, and Junior DE Gavin Stansbury were suspended for two games. Senior DT Kirby Ennis and Junior S Floyd Raven Sr. were suspended for one game. Junior CB Deshazor Everett and Sophomore (RS) QB Johnny Manziel were suspended for a half. Redshirt Junior QB Matt Joeckel started and played the entire first half until Manziel's return.

The Aggies received to start the game and punted after only 1 first down. Drew Kaser started his stellar season off with a 55-yard punt downed inside the 5 yard line. The Owls then started with a strong drive opened by a 26-yard pass from McHargue to Cella. Just a few plays later McHargue would keep the ball on an option play and bust a 57-yard run down field, only just caught from behind by Junior LB Tommy Sanders. Two plays later, Senior RB Charles Ross punched the ball into the endzone to put the Owls up 7–0. On A&M's following series, the ball was in the air only twice out of 10 plays, finished off by a rush from Senior RB Ben Malena for 4 yards for the TD to tie the game. Rice's ensuing drive moved steadily down the field, capped off by an 18-yard scramble by McHargue and a 19-yard wheel route pass to Ross for the TD. Rice was up 14–7. The teams traded punts on their following drives, and with a few minutes left, A&M went on a steady drive down to the Rice 41 to end the quarter.

A&M continued its drive in the 2nd Quarter, highlighted by a 26-yard pass from Joeckel to Sophomore (RS) sensation Mike Evans. Sophomore (RS) RB Tra Carson would run the ball in a few plays later to tie the game. Despite a 22-yard run from Ross on Rice's following drive, the Owls were forced to punt, due to a tackle for a loss by true freshman and future star LB Darian Claiborne on 3rd down. Only a few plays into the Aggies’ next outing, Joeckel hit Freshman receiver Ricky Seals-Jones for a 71-yard TD and the lead. Afterwards, A&M forced Rice to punt once again and then added to their lead with another TD by Carson on a steady drive. With 3:42 left in the half, Rice went on a strong drive including 2 great passes by McHargue to Junior WR Jordan Taylor, one for 27 yards and the other for a 5-yard TD after the ball was deflected by Senior CB Toney Hurd Jr. The score was 28–21 Texas A&M at halftime, after which star Aggie QB Johnny Manziel would return.

Rice received the 2nd half kickoff and had 2 incompletions before McHargue was intercepted by Junior CB Tramain Jacobs, starting Manziel's return to college football. The Sophomore's first play of 2013 was a 12-yard scramble; however, he was sacked just 2 plays later, forcing A&M to take the 44-yard Field Goal. Rice's ensuing drive did not turn out any better than its predecessor, as Junior (RS) S Clay Honeycutt grabbed A&M's second interception of the game. This time, Manziel was able to take the team to the endzone on a 23-yard toss to Evans for the TD. The teams traded punts before Rice went on a nearly 6 minute drive to end the half at A&M's 1-yard line.
On the first play of the 4th Quarter, Ross carried the Owls into the endzone to make the score 28–38. However, A&M's offense had hit its rhythm and Manziel notched a 34-yard pass to Junior (RS) receiver Malcome Kennedy before hitting Malena out of the backfield for 18 yards and the TD. Down by 17, Rice was feeling the pressure on their next drive. After gaining a few yards, the Owls went for it on 4th down, where true Freshman DT Jay Arnold pushed through the line and forced Ross right into Junior DE Tyrell Taylor, where he was tackled for a loss. With a short field, A&M scored quickly via another TD pass to Evans for 9 yards. With little hope of winning the game, Rice put in Sophomore QB Driphus Jackson, who led the team on a long drive capped off by a 43-yard FG. A&M simply ran out the clock with 2:03 left in the game.

Texas A&M won its season opener, and the star Manziel looked as good as ever, going 6-of-8 for 94 yards and three touchdowns; however, Rice ran for 306 yards, averaging 6 yards-per-carry, which hinted at the defensive issues (particularly in the running game) that would haunt A&M for the rest of the season.

Sam Houston State

Sources:

Sam Houston faced Texas A&M for the second consecutive year, facing the FBS powerhouse for the twelfth time. The Aggies had won all previous meetings.

The Aggies drew first blood in the first quarter, with A&M running back Tra Carson finishing a drive with a one-yard scoring run with 10:52 remaining in the period, which followed with the extra point brought the score to 7–0 Aggies. The Bearkats struck back on their next possession, with running back Timothy Flanders scoring on an 11-yard run at the 7:51-minute marker, followed by the extra point tying the score 7–7. Aggies quarterback Johnny Manziel connected with a 27-yard pass to wide receiver Sabian Holmes with less than three minutes in the quarter, putting A&M back on top 14–7.

The Aggies scored again in the second quarter at the 11:31 mark with a one-yard run by running back Ben Malena, however the extra point attempt by kicker Taylor Bertolet failed, with the new score 20–7 Aggies. A&M was again on the board at 4:23 with a 20-yard pass by Manziel to wide receiver Ja'Quay Williams, and with the extra point the new score was 27–7 Aggies. The Bearkats finally answered with a 33-yard pass by quarterback Brian Bell to Flanders, and kicker Luc Swimberghe's extra point brought the score to 27–14 Aggies. The Aggies made the final score in the period with a 35-yard field goal by Bertolet in the closing seconds, with the Aggies leading at halftime 30–14.

The Bearkats struck quickly in the third quarter, with Flanders making a 68-yard scoring running at the 14:04 mark, and the extra point reduced the Aggies lead to 30–21. Not to be outdone, the Aggies made two consecutive scoring drives, culminating in a one-yard run by Carson at the 10:27-minute mark and a ten-yard pass by Manziel to running back Brandon Williams at the 6:27-mark, raising the Aggie's lead to 44–28. The Bearkats struck again a mere 14 seconds after the previous Aggies score with Bell connecting with Torrance Williams on a 75-yard pass, bringing the score to 44–28 Aggies. After that Texas A&M kept the Bearkats from the endzone, and Manziel made a six-yard quarterback keeper at the 5:24-minute mark, Aggies linebacker Nate Askew intercepted Bell for a pick-six with 3:42 remaining in the quarter and backup Aggies quarterback connected with wide receiver Travis Labhart at the 1:14-minute mark, all together raising the lead to 65–28 Aggies.

By the fourth quarter both teams had pulled their starters and the game was a defensive standoff, both teams keeping each other from scoring. The final score was 65–28 Aggies.

Sam Houston quarterback Brian Bell completed six of 15 pass attempts for 137 yards with two interception, with fellow quarterback Don King III completing one pass for 13 yards. Sam Houston's rushing game was anchored by Timothy Flanders who ran 19 times for 170 yards including two running touchdowns, followed by Keshawn Hill who carried the ball three times for 42 yards, Richard Sincere who ran six times for 11 yards and Ryan Wilson who rushed five times for ten yards.

With the loss, Sam Houston is tied 1–1. Texas A&M leads the all-times series 12–0.

Alabama

Sources:

In the first conference game of the 2013 season, Alabama defeated the Texas A&M Aggies at College Station 49–42. Texas A&M opened the game with a pair of touchdowns on their first two offensive possessions and took a 14–0 lead. After they received the opening kickoff, the Aggies scored on their first possession when Johnny Manziel threw a one-yard touchdown pass to Cameron Clear and on their second possession on a one-yard Ben Malena touchdown run. Alabama responded with their first of five consecutive touchdowns on their next possession and cut the A&M lead to 14–7 when A. J. McCarron threw a 22-yard touchdown pass to Kevin Norwood.

After the Crimson Tide defense held the Aggies to a punt, McCarron threw his second touchdown pass of the afternoon on the drive that ensued early in the second quarter on a 44-yard flea flicker pass to DeAndrew White that tied the game 14–14. On the next drive, Cyrus Jones intercepted a Manziel pass in the endzone for a touchback and Alabama possession. McCarron then threw his third touchdown pass on the game from 51-yards to Kenny Bell and gave the Crimson Tide their first lead of the game, 21–14. Alabama then closed the first half with an 11 play, 93 yard drive capped with a four-yard T. J. Yeldon touchdown run for a 28–14 halftime lead.

After the A&M defense forced a punt on the opening possession of the third quarter, Vinnie Sunseri intercepted the first Manziel pass of the second half and returned it 73-yards for a touchdown and extended the Alabama lead to 35–14. The Aggies responded on the drive that followed with a 14-yard Manziel touchdown pass to Malcome Kennedy and was followed with a three-yard Kenyan Drake touchdown run that made the score 42–21 in favor of the Crimson Tide at the end of the third quarter. In the fourth, the Aggies scored first on a 12-yard Kennedy touchdown reception, and Alabama looked like they were about to respond with a touchdown as well, but Yeldon fumbled at the two-yard line that was recovered by A&M. Three plays later, Manziel threw a 95-yard touchdown pass to Mike Evans that cut the Crimson Tide lead to 42–35. Alabama rebounded on their next drive that was capped with a five-yard McCarron touchdown pass to Jalston Fowler that extended their lead to 49–35. A four-yard touchdown pass from Manziel to Kennedy in the last 0:20 made the final score 49–42.

The 628 yards of total offense by the A&M offense were the most ever surrendered by an Alabama defense in the history of the program. For his career-high 334 yards on 20 of 29 passing and four touchdowns, McCarron was recognized as the SEC Offensive Player of the Week. The victory improved Alabama's all-time record against the Aggies to 4–2.

SMU

This game was the 80th meeting of the SMU Mustangs and the Texas A&M Aggies. The most recent match-up was September 15, 2012, a game in which Texas A&M defeated SMU with a final score of 48–3. After this match-up, Texas A&M leads the series 44–29–7.

Arkansas

Ole Miss

Auburn

Auburn's defense came up with a huge final stand to upset 7th rank Texas A&M. With 1:19 left in the game Auburn held a 45–41 lead. A&M's QB Johnny Manziel completed two big pass plays to WR Mike Evans  to get it down to Auburn's 18 yard line. DE Dee Ford would come up with an 8-yard sack then Manziel would throw an incompletion. On the next play Manziel tried to run but was tackled by LB Kris Frost. Then on 4th and long Auburn Dee Ford sacked Manziel once again ending the game. QB Nick Marshall passed for 236 yards and 2 TD's and ran for 100 yards and 2 TD's, he had one fumble. Tre Mason added 178 yards rushing and 2 TD's. The defenses recorded 7 tackles for loss, 3 sacks and 2 interceptions  on the 3rd best offense in the nation. Ryan White who moved to safety that morning after Josh Hosley was injured recorded 5 tackles and an interception without knowing the proper alignments. Auburn's DE LaDarius Owens injured Johnny Manziel early in the 4th Quarter and he missed a series. Auburn would vault to No 11 in the first BCS Poll of the year.

Vanderbilt

UTEP

This was Texas A&M's 700th win in school history.

Mississippi State

 Source:

LSU

Missouri

Duke (Chick-fil-A Bowl)

Notes
 December 22, 2013 – Texas A&M linebacker Darian Claiborne was suspended after he was arrested on suspicion on drug possession.

References

Texas AandM
Texas A&M Aggies football seasons
Peach Bowl champion seasons
Texas AandM Aggies football